Wacoro is a small town and commune in the Cercle of Dioila in the Koulikoro Region of southern Mali. As of 1998 the commune had a population of 9706.

References

External links
Wacoro at csa-mali.org

Communes of Koulikoro Region